Tim Grohmann (born 27 December 1988) is a German rower. He was part of the German crew that won the gold medal in the men's quadruple sculls at the 2012 Summer Olympics in London, with Karl Schulze, Philipp Wende and Lauritz Schoof.

The Olympic winning team also won silver at the 2011 World Championships. Previously, Grohmann had won bronze at the 2009 World Championships with Karsten Brodowski, Marcel Hacker and Tim Bartels.

Grohmann won gold at the 2013 European Championships and silver at the 2013 World Rowing Championships with Karl Schulze, Paul Heinrich and Lauritz Schoof.  He won bronze at the 2014 World Championships and the 2014 European Championships with Karl Schulze, Kai Fuhrmann and Philipp Wende.

References

External links
 

Olympic rowers of Germany
Olympic gold medalists for Germany
Olympic medalists in rowing
Rowers at the 2012 Summer Olympics
Medalists at the 2012 Summer Olympics
Rowers from Dresden
1988 births
Living people
World Rowing Championships medalists for Germany
German male rowers
European Rowing Championships medalists